Stirtonia is a genus of lichenized fungi in the family Arthoniaceae.  It has at least 21 species.

The genus was circumscribed by Annie Lorrain Smith in Trans. Brit. Mycol. Soc. vol.11 on page 195 in 1926.

The genus name of Stirtonia is in honour of James Stirton (1833–), who was a Scottish physician and one of Scotland's leading experts on cryptogamic botany. His investigations in bryology and lichenology earned him a world-wide reputation.

Species
As accepted by GBIF;

 Stirtonia borinquensis 
 Stirtonia byssoidea 
 Stirtonia caribaea 
 Stirtonia coei 
 Stirtonia curvata 
 Stirtonia epiphylla 
 Stirtonia ghattensis 
 Stirtonia ibirapuitensis 
 Stirtonia isidiata 
 Stirtonia latispora 
 Stirtonia lucida 
 Stirtonia microspora 
 Stirtonia neotropica 
 Stirtonia nitida 
 Stirtonia nivea 
 Stirtonia ochracea 
 Stirtonia psoromica 
 Stirtonia punctiformis 
 Stirtonia rhizophorae 
 Stirtonia schummii 
 Stirtonia sprucei 
 Stirtonia viridis

References

Arthoniomycetes
Lichen genera
Arthoniomycetes genera